Denise Christensen is a diver from Tucson, Arizona, United States. She won a gold medal in springboard diving at the 1979 Pan American Games in San Juan.

In 1980 she became AIAW diving champion in springboard, and in 1982 she won the AIAW team championship with the Texas Longhorns.

References

Year of birth missing (living people)
Living people
American female divers
Texas Longhorns women's swimmers
Sportspeople from Tucson, Arizona
Pan American Games gold medalists for the United States
Pan American Games medalists in diving
Divers at the 1979 Pan American Games
Medalists at the 1979 Pan American Games